Josh Stanley Ronald Woods (born 5 July 2000) is an English professional footballer who plays for Accrington Stanley, as a striker.

Career
Woods played for Marine's reserve side and scored on his first-team debut in a friendly on 15 October 2019 against Salford City. He made his league debut on 19 October, and scored his first competitive goal in the Liverpool Senior Cup on 26 November. He was the first player from the newly formed reserves team to play for the Marine first team

After playing for Clay Brow, Woods signed a one-year contract with Accrington Stanley in July 2021.

References

2000 births
Living people
English footballers
Marine F.C. players
Accrington Stanley F.C. players
English Football League players
Association football forwards
Northern Premier League players